Dirk Jacobus Willem "Dick" Nanninga (17 January 1949 – 21 July 2015) was a Dutch footballer who played as a forward. At club level, he played for Dutch sides BV Veendam, Roda JC and MVV Maastricht. He also had a short spell with Hong Kong club Seiko. At international level, he represented the Netherlands at the 1978 FIFA World Cup and UEFA Euro 1980.

Career
Nanninga earned 15 caps and scored 6 goals for the Netherlands national football team. In the 1978 FIFA World Cup final against Argentina in Buenos Aires, he scored the equalizing goal in normal time, but Argentina went on to win 3–1 in extra time.

In the same World Cup, Nanninga became the first substitute player to be sent off, 7 minutes after coming on against West Germany. He and Bernd Hölzenbein clashed as the Dutch took a free kick and Nanninga was shown the yellow card. He was then reported to have laughed at the referee's decision. Confusion reigned, as he was ordered off.

He is Roda JC's all time topscorer having scored 107 goals in 225 matches for the Kerkrade-based club.

Health issues and death
In 2012 Nanninga went into a coma and only regained consciousness five months later. Due to diabetes his left lower leg had to be amputated. In 2014 his right lower leg also had to be amputated. His death was announced on 21 July 2015.

References

External links

1949 births
2015 deaths
Dutch footballers
Netherlands international footballers
Eredivisie players
Eerste Divisie players
Roda JC Kerkrade players
SC Veendam players
MVV Maastricht players
Seiko SA players
Dutch expatriate footballers
Expatriate footballers in Hong Kong
Dutch expatriate sportspeople in Hong Kong
1978 FIFA World Cup players
UEFA Euro 1980 players
Hong Kong First Division League players
Footballers from Groningen (city)
Dutch amputees
People with disorders of consciousness
Association football midfielders